Carlos Machado (born November 9, 1963) is a former world master's champion in Brazilian jiu-jitsu (BJJ) born in Rio de Janeiro, Brazil.  He is the eldest of the five Machado Brothers, known for BJJ, that also includes Roger, Rigan, Jean Jacques and John.  He is also the brother-in-law of UFC fighter Stephen Thompson. He currently runs BJJ schools across the United States, Australia, Canada and Mexico.

Early life 
Carlos started martial arts at the age of four.  His main instructor throughout his life was his cousin Carlos Gracie, Jr. but he has also trained with Helio Gracie, Carlson Gracie, Rolls Gracie, Rickson Gracie, Crolin Gracie, Rillion Gracie and his brothers.  While in Brazil, he successfully competed and was champion for 10 years straight in competition at the State and National level which at the time was equivalent to the Worlds as BJJ had not spread to the masses yet. He competed and won against many of today's top founders of BJJ teams. He believes BJJ is the greatest addition to modern martial arts. 
Carlos also lived with his Uncle Carlos Gracie, founder of Brazilian Jiu-Jitsu and Carlos greatest mentor, for 5 years while attending and eventually graduating from Law School.

Moving to the USA
Carlos was teaching in America as early as 1990.  In April 1994 he moved to Los Angeles, California. There he met martial arts movie star Chuck Norris, who was instrumental in promoting Brazilian Jiu-Jitsu and the Machado family.  Since then, Mr. Norris has been one of the greatest advocates of Machado Brazilian Jiu Jitsu.  Carlos lived in Los Angeles until the end of 1995, when he moved to the city of Dallas, Texas.  There he taught Brazilian jiu-jitsu out of the same building in which Chuck Norris's television show "Walker, Texas Ranger" was filmed.  That allowed Machado not only to teach at his studio, but also to take part in many episodes of that popular show.  He often assisted on choreographing fight scenes with Brazilian Jiu-Jitsu.

Besides running his school, Machado has been involved in competition, winning the Pan American of Brazilian Jiu Jitsu (97/98), he also won several super fights in the U.S. (U.S Open 98/99), he competed in ADCC with a broken foot and still placed and earned the award of fastest submission in 1998, and the World Master's Championships (2000) in two weight divisions (middle weight and open class). After an impressive 34 year competition career he retired from the competition arena winning the Worlds.

He currently holds the highest rank of this style in the Southwest (Eighth Degree Black Belt). Carlos Machado is considered the "god father" of Brazilian Jiu Jitsu in Texas.
Carlos has built one of the fastest growing affiliate school programs in the World, which now includes representatives in Louisiana, Texas, Oklahoma, Florida, Missouri, Philadelphia, North Carolina, South Carolina, New York, Rhode Island, Mississippi, Georgia, Iowa, Michigan, Minnesota, Montana, Nebraska, New Mexico, Tennessee, England, France, Australia, Canada, Brazil and Mexico.
Carlos has also been inducted into no less than 8 Martial Arts Hall of Fame for different contributions to the world of Martial Arts and Brazilians Jiu-Jitsu.

Instructor lineage
Kano Jigoro → Tomita Tsunejiro →   Mitsuyo Maeda → Carlos Gracie. and Hélio Gracie →  Rolls Gracie and Carlos Gracie Jr. → Carlos Machado

See also
List of Brazilian Jiu-Jitsu practitioners

References

External links
 Carlos Machado Jiu-Jitsu
Carlos Machado YouTube Channel
Carlos Machado Official Merchandise

Living people
Brazilian emigrants to the United States
1963 births
Carlos
Sportspeople from Rio de Janeiro (state)
People from Farmers Branch, Texas
People awarded a coral belt in Brazilian jiu-jitsu